Visser is the third companion (Chronicles) book to the Animorphs series, written by K. A. Applegate. Within the continuity of the series, it takes place directly after the events of book #35, The Proposal. The book is narrated by Edriss 562 (Visser One) who is on trial for treason by the Yeerk Council of Thirteen.

Plot summary
The story starts with Visser One, in the body of Marco's mother, Eva. She leaves the house, saying goodbye to her husband and Marco, and heads out to her sailing boat, intending to fake her death so she can leave Earth and become Visser One. She takes her boat out to the ocean, and has a Bug Fighter that is waiting to pick her up to ram the boat, capsizing it. She leaves Earth, and everyone simply assumes that she drowns.

In the present day, Edriss is on trial for treason by the Council of Thirteen. She is still inside Eva, and is currently being held in the Yeerk Pool under the city where the Animorphs live. The Council of Thirteen informs Edriss of her charges, which are five charges of treason, four containing the death penalty. Visser Three, her longtime enemy, is her prosecutor and the one who brought the charges against her. The Council of Thirteen orders her to tell her story of the events.

At the start of her story, Edriss was stationed on a moon in between the Hork-Bajir homeworld and the Taxxon homeworld. Her task is to search for Class Five species, species that are extremely abundant and powerful, but easy to take over. While training a group of new recruits, she receives information that a Class Five species has been found - humans. Two humans were kidnapped by the Skrit Na, and then rescued by Andalites and taken by them to the Taxxon homeworld. A Yeerk Sub-Visser saw them and reported them to Edriss (these events are detailed more in The Andalite Chronicles). Unfortunately, as soon as she receives this news, Edriss is informed she would be transferred to the Taxxon homeworld and be given a Taxxon host. Edriss, along with a fellow Yeerk named Essam 293, steal a Yeerk ship and go looking for the human home world.

Back in the present, Visser Three demands that they view a memory dump (a recording of her memory) of Edriss's trip to Earth. It starts with Edriss and Essam finding the planet, and they land on it during the events of the Gulf War. Edriss infests an Iraqi soldier, and finds out from him that the most powerful country on Earth is America. They dispose of the host and fly their ship to Hollywood. There, Edriss infests a drug addict called Jenny Lines who is a struggling actor, and Essam infests a television producer named Lowenstein. At this point the memory dump ends. Garoff, a member of the Council of Thirteen, accuses Edriss of underestimating the humans, and Edriss says the only reason the humans haven't been taken over is because of Visser Three's incompetence. Visser Three says Edriss never had to deal with the "Andalite Bandits" when she was on Earth, and Edriss asks why Visser Three still hasn't defeated the Andalite bandits. At that point the Andalite bandits attack, however, Visser Three and his troops makes short work of them. Edriss realizes that they were simply animals, not the Andalite bandits, and Visser Three just had them brought in to trick the Council into thinking that he did kill the Andalite bandits.

The Council of Thirteen is fooled by the demonstration and Visser Three has a lot more credibility. Visser Three then says he has testimony from a witness who was with Edriss during the time that Edriss did not make any memory dumps. He says it is Essam, however, Edriss says that can't be true since Essam is dead. Visser Three's guard bring in a homeless man named Hildy Gervais, who is revealed to be a former host of Essam. He says that he and one of Edriss's hosts, Allison Kim, fell in love, and so did their Yeerk captors. Eventually they had two children, twins. Edriss says this is true, and Visser Three claims this is proof of Edriss sympathizing with humans. 
 
Edriss continues her story, telling how eventually she disposed of Jenny Lines and infested Allison Kim, a scientist. Essam also infested Hildy Gervais. Edriss tells how Allison Kim was a far more intelligent, powerful host than Jenny Lines, and Visser Three demands this is proof that she admires the humans. Visser Three and Edriss get into an argument about whether slow infestation or all-out war is a better way to enslave the humans. Visser Three claims that the only reason Edriss doesn't want all out war is because she doesn't want the humans to actually be taken over, and Edriss argues that all out war would never work. Eventually Visser Three demands that Edriss is given a live memory dump, so they can view exactly what happened. Garoff agrees, and they enter her memory at a point a fair while after Edriss had infested Allison.

Garoff demands they view various memories, all showing Edriss enjoying different aspects of human life, her falling in love with Essam/Hildy Gervais, and the birth of her children. Garoff claims that Visser One had become addicted to humans. Garoff ends the live memory dump, and demands Edriss continue the story. Edriss says the children were given up for adoption, and then says she needs a break to eat. Garoff agrees, and the trial is adjourned. She is taken by Visser Three's troops to the lunchroom of the Yeerk Pool, where she sees a Controller talking on her cell phone. Realizing the phone can work this far underground, she purposely bumps into the Controller and steals her phone. She heads to the toilets and calls Marco, her current host's son. She tells him she needs him to attack the Yeerk Pool, so the Council will realize the last attack was a farce constructed by Visser Three. Reluctantly, Marco agrees, and then Edriss heads back to the trial.

Garoff asks her to continue her story. Edriss says that after a year, the shipboard Kandrona was running out, so she contacted the Empire. When she told them she had found a Class Five species, they dropped all charges against her. During this time, she had created a group called The Sharing, a boy scouts/girl scouts style club crossed with a cult, which was used to recruit voluntary Controllers. She sent a tape of the first human-Controller to the Yeerk Empire. When Edriss told Essam they were returning to the Yeerk Empire, he got angry, and tied Edriss up, forcing her to infest another host and taking off with Allison Kim and the children. Edriss takes after him, telling the Council that her intention was to kill him.

At this point, Visser Three interrupts, saying that the real reason Edriss went after him was to get the children back. Edriss claims she didn't care about the children. In response, Visser Three brings one of her children, Darwin, in. Visser Three demands Edriss to kill him, to prove she doesn't care about him. Edriss stalls, unable to kill the kid, and suddenly the Animorphs attack. They knock out Edriss and take her outside to a part of the Yeerk Pool that is hidden by one of the Chee's holograms. Marco demands Edriss leave his mother's body, and she does. For a while she lies alone in the darkness, thinking the Animorphs will kill her, until she is suddenly put back into Eva's head. Looking for her memories, she sees that Eva convinced Marco to keep Edriss alive, because Edriss was the only one pushing for a slow infiltration, which is the only way the Animorphs can win. At that point, they knock her unconscious again, to make her capture look authentic.

Eventually she is found unconscious, and is taken back to the trial. Garoff asks her to continue her story. Edriss talks about how she found Essam at a hospital. He was dying from Kandrona starvation, and eventually he died within Hildy Gervais's head, causing part of Essam's body to become fused with Hildy's brain. Hildy started screaming about the aliens that had infested him, and was taken away to an asylum. Allison escaped, but soon returned for the children in disguise. Edriss killed her. The children were left in the hospital, and eventually adopted. She then killed Lore David Altman, the host she used to create the Sharing, infested Eva, and eventually left Earth to become Visser One.

Garoff says that she has given enough information, and the Council retired to consider their verdict. After a while they returned, minus two Council members who did not agree with the verdict, and say that Visser One and Visser Three have both been sentenced to death by Kandrona starvation. However, the sentences were suspended, and both of them would be free of all charges if they completed the tasks the Council of Thirteen set for them. Visser Three has to complete the invasion of Earth. Visser One had to take another planet, the Anati homeworld. If either of them fail, they will be killed; however, both Visser One and Visser Three are released from custody, meaning Edriss (and Marco's mother) survive. As she is about to leave, Visser One considers telling Visser Three the truth about the "Andalite bandits", but decides against it.

Morphs

Animorphs books
1999 science fiction novels
Fiction portraying humans as aliens
Novels set in Los Angeles
Interquel novels